Rita Dorothy Guggenheim Lerner (May 7 1929 – July 16, 1994) was an American physicist, librarian, editor, and science communicator who worked for many years at the American Institute of Physics. With George L. Trigg, she was co-editor of the Encyclopedia of Physics (Addison-Wesley, 1981).

Life
Rita Guggenheim was born in New York, New York in 1929, and was a 1945 graduate of Fiorello H. LaGuardia High School. She earned a bachelor's degree from Radcliffe College in 1949, and was managing editor of the college yearbook. She went to Columbia University for graduate study, earning a master's degree in 1951 and (as Rita G. Lerner) completing her Ph.D. in 1956; her dissertation was Microwave Studies of Molecular Structure.

She came to the American Institute of Physics in the 1960s, hired as part of a program funded by the National Science Foundation for the improvement of scientific communication.

She died on July 16, 1994 in Ardsley, New York.

Recognition
Lerner was named a Fellow of the American Association for the Advancement of Science in 1986.

References

1929 births
1994 deaths
American physicists
American women physicists
Radcliffe College alumni
Columbia University alumni
Fellows of the American Association for the Advancement of Science